Maria Vasilyevna Golubnichaya (24 February 1924 – August 2015) was a Soviet athlete who mainly competed in the 80 metre Hurdles. She trained at the Burevestnik sports society in Moscow. She competed for the Soviet Union in the 1952 Summer Olympics held in Helsinki, Finland in the 80 metre hurdles, where she won the silver medal.

References

1924 births
2015 deaths
Russian female hurdlers
Soviet female hurdlers
Olympic silver medalists for the Soviet Union
Athletes (track and field) at the 1952 Summer Olympics
Athletes (track and field) at the 1956 Summer Olympics
Olympic athletes of the Soviet Union
Burevestnik (sports society) athletes
European Athletics Championships medalists
Medalists at the 1952 Summer Olympics
Olympic silver medalists in athletics (track and field)